Westwoodiini is a tribe of parasitoid wasps in the subfamily Ctenopelmatinae.

Genera
Westwoodiini contains the following genera:
 Pergaphaga
 Dictyopheltes
 Hypopheltes
 Westwoodia

References

 Ctenopelmatinae
Hymenoptera tribes